"My PYT" is a song by American rapper Wale featuring uncredited vocals from Sam Sneak for his studio album, Shine. The track peaked at number 54 on the Billboard Hot 100.

Background and release
On May 9, 2016, Wale tweeted a line from the song on his Twitter. On May 20, 2016, Wale released the song on iTunes.

The song interpolates the chorus of "P.Y.T. (Pretty Young Thing)" by Michael Jackson and contains a sample of "Sexual Healing" by Marvin Gaye.

Music video
The video of the song was released on July 25, 2016 on YouTube. The video features various video models including Chasity Samone.

Charts

Weekly charts

Year-end charts

Certifications

References

External links

2016 singles
2016 songs
Wale (rapper) songs
Maybach Music Group singles
Atlantic Records singles
Songs written by Wale (rapper)